The 2020 Polish Speedway season was the 2020 season of motorcycle speedway in Poland.

Unia Leszno won the Ekstraliga and were awarded the gold medal and declared Polish Team Champions. The teams finishing second and third were awarded silver and bronze medals respectively. KS Toruń won the 1. Liga and Wilki Krosno won the 2. Liga.

Individual

Polish Individual Speedway Championship
The 2020 Individual Speedway Polish Championship final was held on 7 September at the Stadion im. Alfreda Smoczyka in Leszno. Maciej Janowski won the individual title after recording a 15-point maximum in the heats leading up to the final race.

Golden Helmet
The 2020 Golden Golden Helmet organised by the Polish Motor Union (PZM) was the 2020 event for the league's leading riders. The final was held at Bydgoszcz on the 27 July. Bartosz Zmarzlik won the Golden Helmet.

Junior Championship
 winner - Dominik Kubera

Silver Helmet
 winner - Dominik Kubera

Bronze Helmet
 winner - Mateusz Cierniak

Pairs

Polish Pairs Speedway Championship
The 2020 Polish Pairs Speedway Championship was the 2020 edition of the Polish Pairs Speedway Championship. The final was held on 5 August at Gdańsk.

Team

Team Speedway Polish Championship
The 2020 Team Speedway Polish Championship was the 2020 edition of the Team Polish Championship. Unia Leszno won the gold medal for the fourth successive season. The team included Emil Saifutdinov, Janusz Kołodziej, Piotr Pawlicki Jr., Bartosz Smektała and Dominik Kubera.

Ekstraliga

Play-offs

Semi-finals

Final

1. Liga

No play-offs due to the COVID-19 pandemic.

2. Liga

No play-offs due to the COVID-19 pandemic.

References

Poland Individual
Poland Team
Speedway
2019 in Polish speedway